Silver Lake is a former village and now a neighborhood within the village of Salem Lakes in Kenosha County, Wisconsin, United States. The population was 2,411 at the 2010 census, when the community was still an independent village. On February 14, 2017, the village merged with the town of Salem to create the village of Salem Lakes.

Geography
Silver Lake is located at  (42.549485, -88.169194).

Demographics

2010 census
As of the census of 2010, there were 2,411 people, 908 households, and 629 families living in the village. The racial makeup of the village was 96.1% White, 0.5% African American, 0.2% Native American, 0.1% Asian, 0.1% Pacific Islander, 1.4% from other races, and 1.5% from two or more races. Hispanic or Latino of any race were 4.2% of the population.

There were 908 households, of which 38.5% had children under the age of 18 living with them, 52.4% were married couples living together, 11.0% had a female householder with no husband present, 5.8% had a male householder with no wife present, and 30.7% were non-families. 24.8% of all households were made up of individuals, and 8.6% had someone living alone who was 65 years of age or older. The average household size was 2.65 and the average family size was 3.18.

The median age in the village was 36.8 years. 27.7% of residents were under the age of 18; 7.5% were between the ages of 18 and 24; 25.8% were from 25 to 44; 29.1% were from 45 to 64; and 9.9% were 65 years of age or older. The gender makeup of the village was 51.3% male and 48.7% female.

2000 census
At the 2000 census, there were 2,341 people, 876 households and 613 families living in the village. The racial makeup of the village was 96.88% White, 0.09% African American, 0.56% Native American, 0.17% Asian, 0.81% from other races, and 1.50% from two or more races. Hispanic or Latino of any race were 3.08% of the population.

There were 876 households, of which 40.1% had children under the age of 18 living with them, 54.0% were married couples living together, 11.3% had a female householder with no husband present, and 30.0% were non-families. 23.9% of all households were made up of individuals, and 9.4% had someone living alone who was 65 years of age or older. The average household size was 2.67 and the average family size was 3.21.

30.5% of the population were under the age of 18, 6.1% from 18 to 24, 32.5% from 25 to 44, 20.8% from 45 to 64, and 10.1% who were 65 years of age or older. The median age was 35 years. For every 100 females, there were 100.8 males. For every 100 females age 18 and over, there were 95.1 males.

The median household income was $50,431 and the median family income was $59,844. Males had a median income of $43,879 versus $26,719 for females. The per capita income for the village was $20,757. About 2.4% of families and 4.9% of the population were below the poverty line, including 4.2% of those under age 18 and 10.0% of those age 65 or over.

References

Populated places in Kenosha County, Wisconsin
Former populated places in Wisconsin
Neighborhoods in Wisconsin
Populated places disestablished in 2017